Edward B. Westermann is a Regents Professor of History at Texas A&M University–San Antonio.

Works

References

Texas A&M University faculty
Historians of Germany
American military historians
Living people
Year of birth missing (living people)